Ozerk Ozan (born 1979) is a Norwegian IT entrepreneur, co-founder of Norsk Ideutvikling AS and the social networking service Biip.no.

Ozan was born in Nicosia, Cyprus in 1979. At a young age, he moved to Norway with his family. Ozerk Kamil, his father, is a professor at the Department of Education in the University of Oslo.

Ozan studied medicine in the period 2002–2008 at the University of Oslo. In 2002, he founded Norsk Ideutvikling AS. In 2005, the company launched the online community Biip.no, which two years later had built up a user base of 450,000 users. In 2008, the majority of shares in the company were sold to Egmont Group and Nettavisen (owned as of 2010 by Egmont and Tv2).

In 2015, Ozan started working in the fintech industry and created small ventures. In 2018, he consolidated his early ventures under OpenPayd, headquartered in London.

In November 2018, Ozan founded European Merchant Bank (EMBank) with a license from the European Central Bank. By the end of 2021, EMBank’s business loan portfolio reached €29.7 million and the bank generated an income of €4.3 million.

References 

1979 births
Living people